Sex og Politikk is a non-governmental organisation in Norway that promotes sexual health and rights domestically and internationally. Sex og Politikk is the Norwegian member association of the International Planned Parenthood Federation, and also cooperates with other national and international organisations.

Through the sexuality education campaign Uke Sex, Sex og Politikk offers sex education to schools all across Norway.

References

External links 
 http://www.sexogpolitikk.no/

Abortion-rights organizations
Political advocacy groups in Norway